Dungarvan College (Irish: Coláiste Dhun Garbhán) is a post-primary educational institution in Dungarvan, County Waterford, Ireland. The school offers Junior Certificate and Leaving Certificate programmes, as well as Post Leaving Certificate and Further Education courses.

History
At the time of its founding, Dungarvan College was named after Saint Cathaldus, who was born near Kilcannon, County Waterford and who established a monastic settlement in Lismore, County Waterford in the 7th century.

Historically based on Wolfe Tone Road in Dungarvan, the school has been at its present location since 2002, when a new building was opened.

Progression to WIT
Waterford Institute of Technology offers preferential entry to students who successfully complete a QQI
course in Dungarvan College (or in another partner College of Further Education) and who also meet certain criteria.

Notable academics
Gavin O'Brien, an Irish hurler playing for Waterford, is a business teacher.

See also
 Education in Ireland
 List of further education colleges in Ireland
 Waterford Institute of Technology

References

External links
 

Secondary schools in County Waterford
Further education colleges in the Republic of Ireland